Seyyed Abbas (also Romanized as Seyyed ‘Abbās; also known as Seyyed ‘Abbās-e Ţāleqānī) is a village in Allah-o Akbar Rural District, in the Central District of Dasht-e Azadegan County, Khuzestan Province, Iran. At the 2006 census, its population was 2,659, in 525 families.

References 

Populated places in Dasht-e Azadegan County